Kaj af Ekström was a Swedish figure skater who competed both in men's singles and pair skating.

With partner Elna Henrikson, he won bronze medals at two World Figure Skating Championships: in 1923 and 1924.

Competitive highlights

Men

Pairs 
With Elna Henrikson

With Ragnvi Torslow

References 

Swedish male single skaters
Swedish male pair skaters
Date of birth missing
Date of death missing